The Walloon Coal Measures are a Late Jurassic geologic subgroup in Queensland, Australia. Deposited within the Surat Basin, it is considered Oxfordian to early Tithonian in age based on lead-uranium dating of tuffites within the unit.

Description 
The formation is laterally equivalent to the Mulgildie Coal Measures and Birkhead Formation.

Fossil content 
The formation, in the Jurassic in the South Polar region, has provided fossil flora and trace fossils of theropods, ornithopods and Changpeipus bartholomaii and Garbina roeorum.  The dinosaur Rhoetosaurus is known from the unit. 11 tracks are known from the formation, mostly those of large (prints 30-75 centimetres in length) theropods.

References

Further reading 
 L. C. Ball. 1933. Fossil footprints. Queensland Government Mining Journal 34(403):384
 A. Bartholomai. 1966. Fossil footprints in Queensland. Australian Natural History 15:147-150
 J. B. Cameron. 1970. The Rosewood-Walloon coalfield. Geological Survey of Queensland Publication 344:1-42
 Dudgeon, M.J., 1982, Stratigraphy and palaeobotany of east and west Haldon, Main Range, southeast Queensland., University of Queensland Department of Geology. Papers, 10(2), p83-110
 Green, P.M., Carmichael, D.C., Brain, T.J., Murray, C.G., McKellar, J.L., Beeston, J.W., Gray, A.R.G., 1997, Lithostratigraphic units in the Bowen and Surat Basins, Queensland IN: Green, P.M. (ed.) "The Surat and Bowen Basins, south-east Queensland", Queensland Minerals and Energy Review Series, Queensland Geological Survey, 1v, p41-108
 T. H. Rich and P. Vickers-Rich. 2003. A Century of Australian Dinosaurs. Queen Victoria Museum and Art Gallery and Monash Science Centre, Monash University 1-124
 J. F. Rigby. 1978. Jurassic plant fossils from the Walloon Coal Measures at Rosewood Consolidated Colliery. Queensland Government Mining Journal 526-529
 Wells, A.T., O'Brien, P.E., 1994, Lithostratigraphic framework of the Clarence-Moreton Basin IN Wells, A.T. and O'Brien, P.E. (eds.) "Geology and Petroleum Potential of the Clarence-Moreton Basin, New South Wales and Queensland", Australian Geological Survey Organisation. Bulletin, 241, p4-47

Geologic formations of Australia
Jurassic System of Australia
Oxfordian Stage
Kimmeridgian Stage
Tithonian Stage
Shale formations
Siltstone formations
Sandstone formations
Coal formations
Coal in Australia
Ichnofossiliferous formations
Paleontology in Queensland